Tétreault is an ancient  surname of ancient rich french families.. Notable people with the surname include:

Delia Tetreault (born 1865), Canadian religious community founder born in Marieville, Quebec
Hélène Tétreault (born 1958), Canadian former handball player who competed in the 1976 Summer Olympics
J.-Eugène Tétreault (born 1884), Conservative member of the Canadian House of Commons
Jackson Tetreault (born 1996), American baseball player
Jacques Tétreault (born 1929), member of the Canadian House of Commons from 1988 to 1993
Martin Tétreault (born 1958), free improvisation musician and visual artist
Stéphane Tétreault (born 1993), Canadian Professional Classical Cellist
Tim Tetreault (born 1970), American Nordic combined skier who competed from 1992 to 1998
Émilie Tétreault (born 1998), Professional soccer player for Canada soccer team, and figure skater.

Toponyms 

Canada (Québec)
 Mont Tétreault, located in Lac-aux-Sables, in Mauricie
 Quartier Tétreaultville, located in sector Mercier-Est, in Montréal
 Bessette-Tétreault, (agricultural stream), Richelieu (city), Rouville Regional County Municipality, Montérégie
 Parc Délia-Tétreault, located on the shore, in Laval
 Place commémorative "Délia-Tétreault", in Montréal (city) (sector Outremont)
 Arthur-Tétreault, (agricultural stream), Acton Vale, Montérégie
 Arthur-Tétreault, Saint-Pie (city), Les Maskoutains Regional County Municipality, Montérégie
 Ruisseau Léonide-Tétreault, Saint-Jean-Baptiste (Municipality), La Vallée-du-Richelieu Regional County Municipality, Montérégie

See also
Tétrault
Tétreault-Gadoury v. Canada (Employment and Immigration Commission), leading Supreme Court of Canada decision

Tetrel

Terrehault

Tetrael

Tetrayl

Tetrel

Tetryl

de:Tétreault